Antoine Olivier Pilon (born 23 June 1997) is a Canadian actor.

Early life
Born in Montreal, Antoine Olivier Pilon moved with his family to Port-Daniel–Gascons in Quebec's Gaspésie–Îles-de-la-Madeleine when he was four. Studying in Le Phares school, he returned to Montreal when he was 10.

Career

Pilon landed his first job playing in an ad on the French Canadian RDS sports channel in 2009 when he was 12. In 2010, he played the lead role of Frisson in Frisson des collines followed by a role in Just for Laughs: Gags.

In 2012, he took part in a number of television series playing lead role of William in Les Argonautes, a youth series on Télé-Québec and role of Clovis in Radio-Canada television series Mémoires Vives. He also took part in two seasons of Tactik, a youth series on Télé-Québec and a role in the short film Le Siège and role of Janeau Trudel in the feature film Les Pee-Wee 3D: L'hiver qui a changé ma vie. In 2013, he appeared in the Indochine music video for "College Boy". The controversial video about school bullying was directed by Xavier Dolan and banned on certain stations for viewers below 16.

The following year, Pilon was cast as the lead role in Mommy, also by Xavier Dolan. The film co-won the Jury Prize at the 2014 Cannes Film Festival. Pilon was named one of the best actors under the age of twenty by IndieWire.

Filmography

Feature films 
2011: Thrill of the Hills (Frisson des collines) as Frisson (directed by Richard Roy)
2012: The Pee-Wee 3D: The Winter That Changed My Life (Les Pee-Wee 3D)  (directed by Éric Tessier) 
2012: Laurence Anyways (directed by Xavier Dolan)
2014: Mommy (directed by Xavier Dolan)
2016: 1:54 (directed by Yan England)
2017: Junior Majeur (directed by Éric Tessier)
2018: Youtopia
2019: Before We Explode (Avant qu'on explose)
2020: Most Wanted
2020: Death of a Ladies' Man
2021: Maria Chapdelaine
2021: Sam

Television
2012-2013: Les Argonautes as William (TV series)
2012-2013: Tactik as Jeremy Miville (TV series directed by Stephan Joly and Claude Blanchard)
2012-2013: Mémoires vives as Clovis Landrie (directed by Brigitte Couture)
2014: Subito texto as Vincent Beaucage

Music videos
2013: "College Boy" (song by Indochine) as a bullied student (directed by Xavier Dolan)
2019: "Virtuous Circle" (song by Jordan Klassen, directed by Farhad Ghaderi)

Awards

References

External links

 Antoine Olivier Pilon File (in French), Talent Agency Helena

Male actors from Montreal
1997 births
Canadian male child actors
Canadian male film actors
Canadian male television actors
People from Gaspésie–Îles-de-la-Madeleine
21st-century Canadian male actors
Living people
Best Actor Genie and Canadian Screen Award winners
Best Actor Jutra and Iris Award winners